Ekanamsha is a Hindu goddess. She is primarily identified with the illusory power of Vishnu, Yogamaya. 

The goddess is believed to have been worshipped by the Vrishnis. Many "kinship triads", depicting Vasudeva Krishna, Balarama, and their sister Ekanamsha have been found in the Mathura region, which are stylistically dated to the early centuries of the Common era. She is believed to have also reincarnated as the goddess Subhadra, the daughter of Vasudeva and Rohini.

Etymology 
In Sanskrit, Ekanamsha means "the single, portionless one", and is a name of the new moon. Another interpretation of her name is that the goddess Yogamaya came to be known as Ekanaṃsha because she was born of one part (aṃśa) of Vishnu himself.

Literature

Harivamsa 
According to S. C. Mukherji, a modern scholar, in the Harivamsa, Ekanamsha is identified as a shakti of Vishnu as the goddess of Ekadasi, having descended as the daughter of Nanda to protect the baby Krishna from Kamsa. In the Harivamsa, she is represented as sister of Vishnu, due to which she is offered the epithets Vimala Devi and Yogamaya.

Vishnudharmottara Purana 
The Vishnudharmottara Purana describes the deity as Gandhari (the power of illusion pertaining to Vishnu), and this Gandhari represents the deities Dhrti, Kirti, Pusti, Sraddha, Sarasvati, Gayatri, and Kalaratri.

Brahmavaivarta Purana 
According to the Brahmavaivarta Purana, Ekanamsha was the daughter of Nanda and Yashoda, who was taken away by Vasudeva. When Kamsa tried to kill her, she transformed into the goddess Yogamaya, also known by the epithet Durga. Though in other versions the baby girl is carried to the Vindhya mountains, in this text, she stays with Vasudeva and Devaki. Later, when Krishna marries his chief consort, Rukmini, she is sent with Durvasa to protect and help him.

References

Hindu goddesses
People related to Krishna